Walton Group of Bangladesh is a privately held conglomerate based in Gazipur, Bangladesh. It was founded in 1977 by S.M. Nurul Alam Rezvi, who serves as the company's chairman. The group's flagship company is Walton Hi-Tech Industries Limited, which produces a wide range of consumer electronics, Home appliance, and mobile phone. The group also has interests in real estate, automobiles, and retail.

In recent years, the Walton Group has become one of the largest employers in Bangladesh, with over 30,000 employees. It operates more than 1,000 retail stores across the country under the brand name "Walton Plaza". The group has also expanded its operations internationally, with offices in several countries including China, India, and the United States.

The Walton Group is known for its commitment to social responsibility and has been involved in various philanthropic initiatives in Bangladesh. The group has donated to various causes such as disaster relief, education, and healthcare. In 2019, the company was ranked as the second-largest corporate donor in Bangladesh by the CSR Centre and Sustainability Excellence.

Despite facing criticism over its labor practices and environmental impact, the Walton Group has continued to grow and diversify its business interests. It remains a prominent player in the Bangladeshi economy, with a significant presence in the country's consumer electronics, real estate, and retail sectors.

History 
Walton Group was founded by S.M Nazrul Islam. Nazrul started his career as a small businessman. After the Bangladesh Liberation War of 1971, he started a separate business. In 1977, he founded a new company named after his eldest son S.M Nurul Alam Rezvi called Rezvi & Brothers, abbreviated as R.B. Group. At that time, they used to import televisions. The company made its debut in 2008 as the Walton Group by starting refrigerator manufacture. When S.M Nazrul Islam died in 2017, his eldest son S.M Nurul Alam Rezvi took over as the chairman of the company.

In April 2017, Walton established the country's first-ever and only compressor manufacturing factory. With the inauguration of the plant, Bangladesh has emerged as the world's 15th as well as Asia's 8th compressor manufacturing country.

In January 2018, Walton opens the first ever computer assembly plant. At the same time it became the first ever Bangladeshi company to export locally made laptops to Nigeria.

In February 2020, for the first time, Walton started exporting handsets to the United States as a Bangladeshi original equipment manufacturer company to a renowned American brand, otherwise known as "contract manufacturing".

In April 2022, Walton acquired 3 European brands to make 4.8 million compressors a year. Walton Hi-Tech Industries PLC announced the purchase of two more brands – Zanussi Elettromeccanica (ZEM) and Verdichter (VOE) – from Italia Wanbao-ACC. The Bangladeshi electronics giant acquired the rights of more than 50-years old reputed three European electronics brands and its production plant, a trademark, patent, design and software. With the procurement of the more than 50-year-old Italia Wanbao-ACC compressor brand, Walton is now on course to gain a major foothold in European countries.

In June 2022, Walton announced the establishment of a Research and Innovation Centre in South Korea.

Acquisitions 
 In April 2022, Walton bought 3 European brands aimed at producing 4.8 million compressors a year, making the conglomerate the first-ever Bangladeshi brand to acquire any foreign brand.

Manufacturing and production 
 In April, 2017, Walton established the country's first-ever and only compressor manufacturing factory.
 In April 2017, Walton inaugurated country’s the first ever smartphone manufacturing factory in Bangladesh.
 In January, 2018, Walton opened its first computer and laptop assembly plant in Bangladesh.
 In April 2020, Walton announced plans to produce ventilators.

References 

 
Conglomerate companies of Bangladesh
Home appliance manufacturers of Bangladesh
Mobile phone manufacturers
Heating, ventilation, and air conditioning companies
Electronics companies of Bangladesh
Bangladeshi brands